Thor Porko (7 June 1905 – 1 June 1977) was a Finnish racing cyclist. He won the Finnish national road race title in 1930 and 1936. He also competed at the 1936 Summer Olympics.

References

External links
 

1905 births
1977 deaths
Finnish male cyclists
People from Kronoby
Olympic cyclists of Finland
Cyclists at the 1936 Summer Olympics
Sportspeople from Ostrobothnia (region)